Yemshi Tepe, also Emchi-Tepe or Imshik, is an ancient circular fortress in Afghanistan, 5 kilometers to the northeast of the city of Sheberghan.It is about 100 kilometers west of Balkh, the capital of ancient Bactria. 

The city occupies around 20 hectares, and was built probably by a Hellenistic period foundation at the time of the Kushan Empire in the first centuries after the birth of Christ. It was deceased in the Sassanid period, therefore its ancient name is unknown. The shape of the city was round, about 500 meters in diameter, and had walls with several gates. In the north of the city there was a kind of a castle and next to it a luxurious building that probably served the local rulers. At the end of the 1960s, Afghan-Soviet excavations took place in the city, and a Greek ostracon and various statues were found among other things.  

According to the Soviet archaeologist Sarianidi in 1985:

The circular fortification has a circumference of 1.5 km, and a surface of 18 ha. The round shape of the settlement is rather typical of the structure of Bactrian fortifications of the 1st millennium BCE, such as the fortresses of Balkh or Merv.

Yemshi Tepe is in close proximity (about 500 metres) to the archaeological burial site of Tillya Tepe, dated to 50 BCE-50 CE: it is thought that the rulers of Yemshi Tepe were a branch of the Kushans who were buried in the nearby Tillya Tepe tumuli. Yemshi Tepe is generally described as "a Kushan town".

Literature 

 VI Sarianidi : Bactrian Gold. From the Excavations of the Tillya-Tepe Necropolis in Northern Afghanistan. Aurora, Leningrad 1985, p. 7.
Warwick Ball: Archaeological Gazetteer of Afghanistan. = Catalog des sites archéologiques d'Afghanistan. Éditions Recherche sur les Civilizations, Paris 1982, p. 96 (Synthèse 8).

References

Central Asia
Bactria
Archaeological sites in Afghanistan
Former populated places in Afghanistan
Kushan Empire